Olsztynek  is a town in northern Poland, in Olsztyn County, in the Warmian-Masurian Voivodeship. It is the administrative seat of Gmina Olsztynek. It is part of the historic region of Masuria.

Geography

Transport
Olsztynek station is a stop on the railway line from Olsztyn to Działdowo. The expressway S7 running from Gdańsk via Olsztynek to Warsaw and Kraków, parts of which are still under construction, is part of the European route E77. A direct link to Olsztyn is provided by the expressway S51. The intersection of the S7 and S51 highways is located just outside the town limits of Olsztynek, and the National road 58 also runs through the town.

History

Several decades after the subjugation of the Old Prussians, Hohenstein Castle was erected from 1351 to colonize the Sasna lands at the behest of Günter von Hohenstein, Komtur of the Teutonic Knights at Osterode commandry. A parish church was mentioned for 1348. Grand Master Winrich von Kniprode granted the surrounding settlement town privileges according to Kulm law in 1359. Olsztynek became the seat of the local administration within the State of the Teutonic Order.

During the Polish–Lithuanian–Teutonic War, the 1410 Battle of Grunwald took place in the vicinity of the town, whereby the Poles and Lithuanians defeated the Teutonic Knights.

In the succeeding fights, Olsztynek was seized and burnt down to the grounds, in order not to let it pass into Polish hands. Quickly rebuilt afterwards, the citizens however had to face high taxes imposed by the Knights who had to refinance their contributions paid according to the 1411 Peace of Thorn. In turn the town became a member of the Prussian Confederation in 1444, opposing the authority of the Order's State.  At the request of the organization, in 1454, King Casimir IV Jagiellon signed the act of incorporation of the region to the Kingdom of Poland, and the town recognized itself as part of the Kingdom of Poland, but returned to the Order's rule during the Thirteen Years' War in 1455. After the peace treaty signed in Toruń in 1466 it became a part of Poland as a fief held by the Order's State, until the conversion of Grand Master Albert von Hohenzollern to Lutheranism in 1525, whereafter the town became part of the Protestant Duchy of Prussia, also a Polish fief. During the Polish–Teutonic War (1519–21), the town was captured by Polish troops under Hetman Mikołaj Firlej, who confirmed the town privileges.

17th-19th century

During the Polish–Swedish War of 1626–1629, Polish troops were stationed around the town in 1626. During the Second Northern War it was plundered by Swedish troops in 1656. Since 1618 ruled in personal union with the Imperial Margraviate of Brandenburg as Brandenburg-Prussia, although the Prussian part remained under Polish suzerainty until 1657. Hohenstein/Olsztynek with Ducal Prussia was incorporated into the Kingdom of Prussia in 1701. In 1804 a fire destroyed 108 houses and the townhall. During the Napoleonic Wars in 1807 the French stayed in Olsztynek, including Marshals of France Michel Ney and Pierre Augereau.

After the 1871 unification of Germany the town lay inside the German Empire. Administratively, the town was part of Landkreis (district) Osterode (Ostróda) in the Province of East Prussia. Although Olsztynek was outside the authority of Poland after 1657, in the late 19th century Poles still formed the majority of the local Lutheran parish (majority of the town's population was Lutheran), with 3,344 people in comparison to 1,966 Germans.

20th century

From 1903 to 1933 the Tuberculosis sanatorium Hohenstein for male patients operated in the municipal forest about 4 km north of the town center.

In the beginning of World War I in August 1914, Imperial Russian Army troops occupied the region but were defeated by German Army forces under General Paul von Hindenburg and Chief of Staff Erich Ludendorff in the Battle of Tannenberg. The battle actually was fought from 27 to 29 August in and around Hohenstein, whereby 115 buildings including the town hall were demolished. However, Hindenburg urged to name it after Tannenberg to counter the myth of the "German" defeat in the 1410 Battle of Grunwald, which was known as the (First) Battle of Tannenberg in German sources.

The town's reconstruction started during World War I with financial aid from Leipzig and was largely completed by 1920. The townhall was finalized in 1922/23. As a condition of the Treaty of Versailles, the League of Nations held the East Prussian plebiscite on 11 July 1920 to determine if the people in the southern districts of the East Prussian province wanted to remain within the Free State of Prussia and Germany or to join the Second Polish Republic, which just regained independence after World War I. The plebiscite resulted in 1,780 votes for Germany and 20 for Poland.

In remembrance of the 1914 battle a large Tannenberg Memorial was inaugurated here on 18 September 1927, and made the place of the burial of Reich President Paul von Hindenburg on 7 August 1934. In World War II parts of the premises were used for the Stalag I-B prisoner-of-war camp. The memorial was partly demolished by the German forces withdrawing from the Soviet advance in 1945, after Hindenburg's coffin (and his wife's) were removed, and completely demolished by the Polish government in 1949. A surviving lion is displayed in front of the Olsztynek town hall.

In January 1945 it was occupied by the Red Army throughout the East Prussian Offensive. Later it was handed over to the Republic of Poland; the German population was expelled in accordance with the Potsdam Agreement and the region was resettled with Poles, especially those expelled from territories of Poland annexed by the Soviet Union. In 1960 a memorial for the 1410 Battle of Grunwald was erected by Polish authorities.

Sports
It competes in the lower leagues.

Notable people

Krzysztof Celestyn Mrongovius (1764–1855), Polish pastor, linguist, writer and translator, opponent of Germanisation
Hieronim Derdowski (1852–1902), Kashubian-Polish intellectual, poet and activist
Paul Wendland (1864–1915), German classical philologist
Paul Kahle (1875–1964), German orientalist
Albert Lieven (1906–1971), German actor
Klaus Porbadnik (born 1930), German athlete

Further reading 
 Aleksandr Solzhenitsyn describes the Battle of Tannenberg in his book "August 1914".

Notes

External links

 
 History (German)
 Skansen Open-Air-Museum, (Polish)

Cities and towns in Warmian-Masurian Voivodeship
Olsztyn County